Mandaar is an Indian Bengali-language crime thriller drama streaming television series created by Anirban Bhattacharya and Pratik Dutta. A loose adaptation of Macbeth by William Shakespeare, Bhattacharya makes his directorial debut on the OTT platform through this series. It stars Sohini Sarkar as Laili (Lady Macbeth), Debasish Mondal as Mandaar (Macbeth), Debesh Roy Chowdhury as Dablu Bhai (King Duncan), and Anirban Bhattacharya as Muqaddar Mukherjee, a corrupt police officer.

Mandaar is the first offering from the library of "hoichoi World Classics", an endeavor in which Hoichoi intends to adapt several global works of literature, to recreate them for the modern Bengali milieu in an OTT format. It has been released on Hoichoi on 19 November 2021. It has received critical acclaim, with praise for its cinematography, performances, makeup, and background score.

Premise
Dablu Bhai is the powerful leader in the coastal fishermen's village of Geilpur. He exploits the fishermen with association from local politician Modon Halder. Mandaar works as a henchman for Dablu Bhai. Dablu Bhai sends Mandaar to kill a supervisor. While returning after completing the murder, an old female witch tells Mandaar metaphorically that he will take over the reign of Dablu Bhai.

Cast

Episodes

Series 1 (2021)

Production
The production began in October 2020. The series has been extensively shot at Mandarmani and Tajpur in the Medinipur district of West Bengal.

Music 
The background score of Mandaar is composed by Subhadeep Guha. In a promotional interview, Guha said, "The world of Macbeth is a bloody one. There's nothing normal there. So is Mandaar for me. Therefore, I thought of sounds that didn't seem to be normal- dissonant, disordered, non-rhythmical. There's a disharmony in the sound of Mandaar."

The audio jukebox of the original soundtrack album was released by SVF on 28 December 2021.

Release
Mandaar premiered on 19 November 2021, all the episodes has been available immediately.

Reception
Sankhayan Ghosh of Film Companion praised the series, commenting, "Mandaar is dramatically tense, a visceral epic that intrigues and entertains in equal measure". Writing for News Nine, Ishita Sengupta rated the series 3.5/5 and praised the lesser-known cast, production design, and the direction. Shaheen Irani of OTTplay.com gave 3.5/5 and said that Bhattacharya's direction has "focused on details used his surroundings and characters to the fullest".

References

External links
 Mandaar on Hoichoi
 

2021 web series debuts
Indian web series
Bengali-language web series
Hoichoi original programming
Works based on Macbeth
Modern adaptations of works by William Shakespeare